James Daniel Bishop (born July 1, 1964) is an American attorney and politician serving as the U.S. representative for  since 2019, when the district was numbered as the 9th. A Republican, his district includes south-central Mecklenburg, Union, Anson, Richmond, Scotland, Robeson, Hoke, and southern Moore Counties. He served in the North Carolina House of Representatives from 2015 to 2017 and the Mecklenburg County Commission from 2005 to 2009. He served in the North Carolina State Senate from 2017 to 2019.

Bishop was the lead author of North Carolina's Public Facilities Privacy & Security Act, commonly called the bathroom bill, which prohibited transgender people from using public restrooms other than those of their biological sex as defined on their birth certificates. As a result of backlash, North Carolina lost a significant amount of revenue from companies and other organizations who chose to withdraw their investments in the state.

On September 10, 2019, Bishop won the special election to the U.S. House of Representatives with 50.7% of the vote to Dan McCready's 48.7%.

Bishop ran for re-election in 2022 in North Carolina's 8th congressional district, following the 2020 census and subsequent litigation contesting the maps drawn by the General Assembly. In the 2022 U.S. Congressional election, Bishop won reelection to his seat with 69.9% of the vote.

Education
Bishop received a B.S. in business administration from the University of North Carolina at Chapel Hill in 1986 and a J.D. from the University of North Carolina School of Law in 1990. He is a member of the Sigma Chi fraternity.

County Commission and North Carolina House of Representatives (2005–2016) 
Bishop was a member of the Mecklenburg County Commission from 2004 to 2008. After a six-year absence from politics, he was elected to the North Carolina House of Representatives from a south Charlotte seat for a single term (2015–17), running against a Libertarian opponent, Eric Cable, but without a Democratic one. Bishop's district was House District 104. He succeeded Ruth Samuelson, who retired from the House.

North Carolina State Senate 
Bishop won his North Carolina State Senate District 39 seat in November 2016 to succeed Bob Rucho, who was not seeking reelection. He received 58,739 votes (52.81%), defeating Democrat Lloyd Scher, who received 44,655 (47.19%).

During the 2017–18 legislative session, Bishop co-chaired the Select Committee on Judicial Reform and Redistricting, was vice-chair of the Select Committee on Elections, and a member of several other committees.

Bishop has attracted attention for statements attacking journalists, which have been likened to statements by Donald Trump. On one occasion, he criticized the Raleigh press corps over coverage of the state budget, calling them the "jihad media."

Bathroom bill and backlash 
Bishop was the architect of the Public Facilities Privacy & Security Act, or House Bill2. This controversial "bathroom bill" restricted transgender people from using gender-segregated public facilities other than those identified for use by their biological sex as defined on their birth certificates. The bill, signed into law by Governor Pat McCrory, also invalidated a local nondiscrimination law passed by the Charlotte City Council and prohibited any local government in North Carolina from enacting new protections for gay, lesbian, or transgender people. Bishop used his sponsorship of HB2 in fundraising emails, stating that he stood up to the "radical transgender agenda". His role in promoting HB2 raised his profile.

In 2017, after a public backlash against the legislation and economic harms of $3.7 billion, HB2 was repealed and replaced with new compromise legislation brokered between Governor Roy Cooper and the leadership of the state legislature. Bishop was the sole senator to make a floor speech against HB2's revocation, calling it a "betrayal of principle". In emails from Bishop subsequently made public under North Carolina's public-records law, Bishop compared LGBT rights activists to the Taliban.

After the release of a video showing a group of people following McCrory, shouting "shame" and calling him a bigot, Bishop said he would introduce legislation "to make it a crime to threaten, intimidate, or retaliate against a present or former North Carolina official in the course of, or on account of, the performance of his or her duties."

U.S. House of Representatives

Elections

2019 special election

On March 14, 2019, Bishop entered the 9th congressional district special election. He won the May 14 Republican primary with 47% of the vote. The election had been called after the results of the regular election were thrown out due to irregularities with absentee ballots in the district's eastern portion. The Republican nominee in that contest, Mark Harris, had defeated Democrat Dan McCready by 905 votes, the closest race in the district in decades. Much of the district's share of Mecklenburg County had not been represented by a Democrat since 1953, and the 9th has been in Republican hands without interruption since it was configured as a Charlotte-based district in 1963.

In the September 10 general election, Bishop defeated McCready, 50.7% to 48.7%. He won mainly by dominating the more rural areas of the district, as well as Union County, the district's largest whole county. The closeness of the race was remarkable given the 9th's heavy Republican bent on paper; it had a Cook Partisan Voting Index of R+8.

Tenure
Bishop took office on September 17, 2019.

Bishop, along with all other Senate and House Republicans, voted against the American Rescue Plan Act of 2021.

Bishop is widely regarded as a leading contender for chair of the Homeland Security Committee if Republicans gain control of the House after the 2022 midterms.

2020 presidential election 
In December 2020, Bishop was one of 126 Republican members of the House of Representatives to sign an amicus brief in support of Texas v. Pennsylvania, a lawsuit filed at the United States Supreme Court contesting the results of the 2020 presidential election, in which Biden defeated Trump. The Supreme Court declined to hear the case on the basis that Texas lacked standing under Article III of the Constitution to challenge the results of an election held by another state.

On January 6, 2021, Bishop was one of 147 Republican lawmakers who objected to the certification of electoral votes from the 2020 presidential election after a mob of Trump supporters stormed the U.S. Capitol and forced an emergency recess of Congress. Later that month, he voted against impeaching Trump for his role in inciting the mob to storm the Capitol.

Iraq
In June 2021, Bishop was one of 49 House Republicans to vote to repeal the AUMF against Iraq.

Syria
In 2023, Bishop was among 47 Republicans to vote in favor of H.Con.Res. 21 which directed President Joe Biden to remove U.S. troops from Syria within 180 days.

Defense
Bishop was among 19 House Republicans to vote against the final passage of the 2022 National Defense Authorization Act.

In July 2022, Bishop was the only House Republican to vote for an amendment that would have cut the proposed defense budget by $100 billion. On the same day, Bishop was one of 14 Republicans to vote for a separate amendment that would have removed a proposed $37 billion spending increase in the defense budget.

Immigration
Bishop voted against the Further Consolidated Appropriations Act of 2020, which authorizes DHS to nearly double the available H-2B visas for the remainder of FY 2020.

Bishop voted against the Consolidated Appropriations Act (H.R. 1158), which effectively prohibits Immigration and Customs Enforcement from cooperating with the Department of Health and Human Services to detain or remove illegal alien sponsors of Unaccompanied Alien Children.

Committee assignments 
 Committee on Homeland Security
 Committee on the Judiciary

Caucus memberships 
Freedom Caucus
Republican Study Committee
House Campus Free Speech Caucus
Election Integrity Caucus

Financial contributions to the far-right social network Gab 
In August 2017, Bishop contributed $500 toward the establishment of the social network Gab, a website criticized for its white supremacist and far-right content. He said he made the contribution in response to what he called a California "tech giants' Big Brother routine", referring to companies such as PayPal and Facebook canceling accounts used by organizers and funders of the Unite the Right rally, in Charlottesville, Virginia. Bishop's crowdfunding contribution attracted attention the next year, after the Pittsburgh synagogue shooting. He responded that he was being "smeared", saying, "I don't use Gab, but if its management allows its users to promote violence, anti-Semitism, and racism on the platform they have misled investors and they will be gone quickly, and rightfully so." The contribution came up again a week after the 2019 El Paso shooting and a month before Bishop's House election. A group called Stand Up Republic aired criticism of his contribution to Gab as part of a $500,000 advertising campaign. Bishop criticized the advertising, calling it "defamatory".

Personal life 
Bishop is a Methodist.

Electoral history

References

External links

Congressman Dan Bishop official U.S. House website
Campaign website
Dan Bishop at Ballotpedia
Our Campaigns – Dan Bishop (NC) profile
 

|-

|-

|-

|-

|-

1964 births
21st-century American lawyers
21st-century American politicians
County commissioners in North Carolina
Discrimination against LGBT people in the United States
Living people
American Methodists
Methodists from North Carolina
Republican Party members of the North Carolina House of Representatives
North Carolina lawyers
Republican Party North Carolina state senators
Republican Party members of the United States House of Representatives from North Carolina
University of North Carolina School of Law alumni
Candidates in the 2019 United States elections